Torasi Estuary is the estuary of Bensbach River, located at the southern end of the Indonesia–Papua New Guinea border. It empties into the Arafura Sea. The mouth of the estuary is administrated by Indonesia with Papua New Guinean ships given right of passage to pass the mouth. There is an Indonesian Navy outpost at the west bank which also operates as a border control to regulate immigration between citizens of the two countries.

References 

Border crossings of Indonesia
Estuaries of Indonesia
International rivers of Asia
International rivers of Oceania
Merauke
Western Province (Papua New Guinea)
Indonesia–Papua New Guinea border